Reinhardt Fortuin (born ) is a South African rugby union player for the  in Super Rugby Unlocked. His regular position is fly-half.

Fortuin was named in the  squad for the Super Rugby Unlocked competition.

In January 2023 he was selected by the Netherlands for the 2023 Rugby Europe Championship.

References

South African rugby union players
Living people
1996 births
Rugby union fly-halves
Cheetahs (rugby union) players
Free State Cheetahs players
Rugby union players from Pretoria
Dutch rugby union players
Netherlands international rugby union players